Fran Frisch (August 18, 1948 – August 29, 2021) was an American cartoonist for the Bay Area Reporter and Bear Magazine.

References

1948 births
2021 deaths
American cartoonists
American gay artists